Lizella   is an unincorporated community in Bibb and Crawford County, Georgia, United States, approximately  southwest of Macon. It is part of the Macon Metropolitan Statistical Area.

U.S. Route 80 passes through Lizella.

History

Lizella was established circa 1891, when the Macon and Birmingham Railroad Co. laid tracks to LaGrange amid a collection of farms west of Macon.

The settlement was originally named Warrior.  The first local postmaster, James A. Eubanks, drew the name Lizella from the names of his two daughters, Lizzie and Ella.

Mother's Day storm 2008

On May 11, 2008, an EF2 tornado touched down in Lizella at 5:45 am. The storm caused extensive damage to parts of the Macon metropolitan area, and cleanup took more than a year.

Recreation

Lake Tobesofkee, less than a mile from Lizella, has three parks: Claystone Park and Sandy Beach Park, both located on Moseley-Dixon Road near I-475, and Arrowhead Park, on Columbus Road near U.S. 80. Each park features covered picnic pavilions and restroom facilities.

Claystone and Sandy Beach parks have beaches and children's playgrounds. Sandy Beach also offers lighted tennis courts and a softball field for public use. The beaches are topped with white sand before each summer season. Each beach is staffed with lifeguards.

References

Unincorporated communities in Georgia (U.S. state)
Unincorporated communities in Bibb County, Georgia
Macon metropolitan area, Georgia